John Coltrane and Johnny Hartman is a studio album by John Coltrane and Johnny Hartman which was released by Impulse! Records in July or August 1963. It was inducted into the Grammy Hall of Fame in 2013.

Background
Although it is often reported that Coltrane and Hartman had known each other since their days playing with Dizzy Gillespie's band in the late 1940s, their time in the band never overlapped. Coltrane might have heard Hartman sing at a 1950 Apollo Theater performance at which they shared the stage.<ref>Gregg Akkerman, The Last Balladeer: The Johnny Hartman Story , Scarecrow Press (67). Excerpt at JazzTimes.com.</ref> Hartman is the only vocalist with whom the saxophonist would record as a leader. Initially when producer Bob Thiele approached Hartman with Coltrane's request that the two record together, Hartman was hesitant as he did not consider himself a jazz singer and did not think he and Coltrane would complement one another musically. However, Thiele encouraged Hartman to go see Coltrane perform at Birdland in New York City to see if they could work something out. Hartman did and after the club closed, he, Coltrane and Coltrane's pianist, McCoy Tyner, went over some songs together. On March 7, 1963, Coltrane and Hartman had decided on 10 songs for the record album, but en route to the studio they heard Nat King Cole on the radio performing "Lush Life", and Hartman immediately decided that song had to be included in their album.

Recording and music
They recorded on March 7, 1963, at the Van Gelder Studio in Englewood Cliffs, New Jersey. Hartman later said that each song was done in only one take, except for "You Are Too Beautiful", which required two takes because Elvin Jones dropped one of his drumsticks during the first take.

Jazz writer Michael Cuscuna explains the speculation of two different versions of the album: "At a later date, Coltrane decided to overdub some additional obbligato saxophone phrases behind Hartman's vocals on 'My One and Only Love', 'Lush Life' and 'You Are Too Beautiful'. A new master was made by Rudy Van Gelder, who added some additional echo to the three tracks. Although the first release of the album used the original master without Coltrane's additional obbligatos, it was later substituted with the new master."

In 2005, the raw tapes were reviewed by jazz archivist Barry Kernfeld, who documented there were actually complete alternate takes for all six songs that he considered "absolutely riveting." Until clear ownership of these tapes is established between the Coltrane family and Universal Music, there are no plans for their release.

Release and reception
The album was announced on July 6, 1963, in Billboard. Bob Thiele produced it and Impulse! released it toward the end of the month. It has become a classic ballad jazz album, and the renditions of "Lush Life", "My One and Only Love", and "They Say It's Wonderful" are considered definitive."My One and Only Love (1953)", JazzStandards.com. Scott Yanow's five-star review for AllMusic describes the album as "essential for all jazz collections".

Kurt Elling recorded an album in 2009 Dedicated to You: Kurt Elling Sings the Music of Coltrane and Hartman in tribute to John Coltrane and Johnny Hartman''.

Track listing

Personnel
Johnny Hartman – vocals
John Coltrane – tenor saxophone
McCoy Tyner – piano
Jimmy Garrison – double bass
Elvin Jones – drums

Charts

References 

1963 albums
John Coltrane albums
Johnny Hartman albums
Impulse! Records albums
Albums produced by Bob Thiele
Albums recorded at Van Gelder Studio
Grammy Hall of Fame Award recipients